Richard Maudeley, D.D.  was  an English priest in the 16th-century.

Maudeley was educated at Oriel College, Oxford in 1537. He held incumbencies at Sherington and Thame; was appointed Archdeacon of Leicester in 1518.

Notes

16th-century English people
Archdeacons of Leicester
Alumni of Oriel College, Oxford